Alexandra Pomales (born July 4, 1995 United States), is an American actress and TV host.

She is known internationally for participating in telenovelas of Telemundo and Nickelodeon (Latin America). In 2014, she participated in the ABC TV series Killer Women as a series regular and was host of her own show called Turn IT On in 2013. She is of Puerto Rican descent.

Filmography

Awards And Nominations

References

External links

1995 births
Living people
American telenovela actresses
Actresses from Indiana
American people of Puerto Rican descent
21st-century American women